Mehdi Shabani (born 1975 in Tehran, Iran) has worked in several professions, as a director, writer, taxi driver, bookseller, cook and company executive.

His directorial credits include, Shesh-Besh: How I learned to stop worrying and play backgammon (Turkey, 2013), a feature documentary about backgammon aired on VOA (Voice of America); The Bathhouse that wanted to keep on being a bathhouse (Iran, 2009–2010), aired on BBC and Emigration: An Unfinished Life (Iran, Turkey, 2011–2013). 
He has published a collection of poems, prepared and presented radio programs in several Persian-language radios as well as a series of articles about the arts, history and politics in Iranian and Persian newspapers.

His last movie, "Meyhane, A Home For My Grandfather" has been officially selected in some festivals included 15.Ankara International Film Festival and 8.Istanbul Documentarist Film Festival.

Filmography 

Mehdi Shabani has been involved in the following films:

•	The Revenge (2002 Iran)

•	Street-Style Politics (2003 Iran)

•	Such as It Was, Nevertheless a Fine Life:that of Contemporary Iranian Poet Shams Langroodi (2008 Iran)

•	Feature-length documentary “Emigration: An unfinished life“ (2011–2013 Iran/Turkey)

•	The Bathhouse that wanted to keep on being a bathhouse (2011 Iran) aired by BBC Persian

•	Shesh-Besh: How I learned to stop worrying and play backgammon (2013 Turkey) aired by VOA

•	Meyhane, A Home for My Grandfather (2014 Turkey)aired by BBC Persian

•	SAKALLOGIA (2016 Turkey)

•	Lenin, O Angel of Grace (2018 Moscow/Baku) aired by BBC Persian

•	Rishology (2020 Turkey/Iran/Afghanistan) aired by BBC Persian

See also 

Iranian Cinema

External links 
 https://web.archive.org/web/20150524194201/http://www.mehdishabani.com/
 http://www.bbc.co.uk/persian/arts/2012/10/121017_aparat_week_42.shtml
 https://web.archive.org/web/20150524194201/http://www.mehdishabani.com/#!the-premiere-of-shesh-besh/c2456
 https://web.archive.org/web/20150524194201/http://www.mehdishabani.com/#!birgun-newsspaper/cv28
 https://web.archive.org/web/20150524194201/http://www.mehdishabani.com/#!trt-turk/c20ue
 https://web.archive.org/web/20150524194158/http://www.acikgazete.com/soylesi/2013/10/19/iran-in-aykiri-yonetmeni.htm?aid=53028
 http://www.thelira.comhaber/154314/meyhaneleri-arayan-film
 https://web.archive.org/web/20150524194201/http://www.mehdishabani.com/#!meyhane-birgun/c1b36
 https://www.facebook.com/video.php?v=712093648839580&set=vb.626326400749639&type=2&theater
 http://docunight.com/post/102986601672/10-the-bathhouse-that-wanted-to-keep-on-being-a
 http://yabangee.com/2014/12/conversation-filmmaker-mehdi-shabani-part-1/
 https://web.archive.org/web/20150524213305/http://www.maltepe.bel.tr/haber/iranli-yonetmenin-belgeseline-maltepe-belediyesi-/1013/19655
 http://www.otekisinema.com/2015/03/meyhane-dedemin-can-evi-2014/
 http://www.bbc.co.uk/persian/arts/2015/03/150324_sam_meykhaneh
 http://www.filmfestankara.org.tr/filmler/meyhane-dedemin-can-evi-meyhane-a-home-for-my-grandfather/

People from Tehran
Iranian film directors
1975 births
Living people